The 27th parallel south is a circle of latitude that is 27 degrees south of the Earth's equatorial plane. It crosses the Atlantic Ocean, Africa, the Indian Ocean, Australasia, the Pacific Ocean and South America.

At this latitude the sun is visible for 13 hours, 52 minutes during the December solstice and 10 hours, 24 minutes during the June solstice.

Around the world
Starting at the Prime Meridian and heading eastwards, the parallel 27° south passes through:

{| class="wikitable plainrowheaders"
! scope="col" width="125" | Co-ordinates
! scope="col" | Country, territory or ocean
! scope="col" | Notes
|-
| style="background:#b0e0e6;" | 
! scope="row" style="background:#b0e0e6;" | Atlantic Ocean
| style="background:#b0e0e6;" |
|-
| 
! scope="row" | 
|
|-valign="top"
| 
! scope="row" | 
| Northern Cape, also North West, Free State and Mpumalanga
|-
| 
! scope="row" | 
|
|-
| 
! scope="row" |  
| KwaZulu-Natal (bordering Eswatini)
|-
| style="background:#b0e0e6;" | 
! scope="row" style="background:#b0e0e6;" | Indian Ocean
| style="background:#b0e0e6;" | 
|-valign="top"
| 
! scope="row" | 
| Western Australia South Australia Queensland - mainland and Bribie Island
|-valign="top"
| style="background:#b0e0e6;" | 
! scope="row" style="background:#b0e0e6;" | Pacific Ocean
| style="background:#b0e0e6;" | Passing just north of Moreton Island, Queensland,  Passing just north of Easter Island, 
|-
| 
! scope="row" | 
|
|-
| 
! scope="row" | 
| Passing near the cities of Resistencia (27°27′05″S 58°59′12″W), Corrientes (27°29′S 58°49′W) and Posadas (27°22′S 55°54′W).
|-
| 
! scope="row" | 
|
|-
| 
! scope="row" | 
|
|-
| 
! scope="row" | 
| Santa Catarina
|-
| style="background:#b0e0e6;" | 
! scope="row" style="background:#b0e0e6;" | Atlantic Ocean
| style="background:#b0e0e6;" | 
|}

See also
26th parallel south
28th parallel south

s27